The Runde West Side Bird Sanctuary is a bird sanctuary and Ramsar site on the  island of Runde in the municipality of Herøy in Møre og Romsdal county, Norway. The area was protected in 1981 together with three other bird sanctuaries in order to "take care of rich and interesting bird life and a bird habitat, especially with respect to seabirds," according to the conservation regulations.

The area covers the west side of the bird cliff on Runde, from just south of the Runde Lighthouse all the way to the southwest end of the island with the Lundeura and Raudenipa viewing points.

In 2013, the area was designated a Ramsar wetland site as one of five subareas of the Runde Ramsar Site.

References

External links
 lovdata.no, Forskrift om vern for 4 fuglefredningsområder og vern av fuglelivet på og omkring Runde i Herøy og Ulstein kommunar, Møre og Romsdal (Regulations for Protection of Four Bird Sanctuaries and Protection of Bird Life on and around Runde in the Municipalities of Herøy and Ulstein, Møre og Romsdal)
 Mijlø-direktoratet: Runde 
 Miljøverndepartementet. 1981. Runde fredningsområde. 1:5,000 map of the nature reserve. 
 Runde Bird Sanctuary. 2010. County Governor of Møre and Romsdal.

Ramsar sites in Norway
Nature reserves in Norway
Protected areas of Møre og Romsdal
Protected areas established in 1981
Herøy, Møre og Romsdal
1981 establishments in Norway